Baba Mastnath (born 1764) was a Hindu saint. He was born in Kansreti village in Rohtak district in the Indian state of Haryana. His Father name Sabla ji belongs to Rebari Hindu community. He is a reincarnation of Guru Gorakshnath ji. He moved to Math Asthal Bohar (established by Chauranginath ji in the 8th century). He rejuvenated it and resurrected the Math.  In 2012 his seventh disciple Mahant Chandnath established Baba Mast Nath University in his name. Maharaja was present in his five-physical elements for a hundred years. In his time, the monarchy of Delhi was weakening as a result of the religious fanaticism of Aurangzeb, the independence of the Subedars, the destruction of the foreign invasions and the conspiracy to take away the traditional political power of the European companies. The provinces of Punjab, Haryana etc. were getting dilapidated. Chaurangi Nathji meditated by enlightening continuous fire is known as Dhuna for twelve years.

Annual Fair
Baba Mast Nath Mela is celebrated in the memory of Baba Mast Nath and is held on Phalgun Sudi 7 (February–March), On 7th, 8th & 9th of Shukla Paksh(Lunar) Phagun (फाल्गुन मास के शुक्ल पक्ष की सप्तमी से नवमी) (11th solar month, 12th Hindu month, Feb-March) Annual fair is celebrated every year. People worship at the samadh of the saint at Bohar (Rohtak tahsil). This fair is held at Khera Sadh (Rohtak Tahsil) where people worship both in the temple and at the samadh.

Literary work on Baba Mast Nath
 Books
 
 
 
 Gazetteer
 Page 42 Section People of Rohtak District Gazetteer – 1970.
 Page 325 Section-Places of interest, Asthal Bohar (Tahsil Rohtak) of Rohtak District Gazetteer – 1970.
 Page 64 Section-Mahants of Baba Mast Nath of Haryana District Gazetteers of 1910.

See also
 Mahant Totanath 
 Mahant Meghnath 
 Mahant Moharnath 
 Mahant Chetnath 
 Mahant Purannath 
 Mahant Shreyonath 
 Mahant Chandnath 
 Mahant Balaknath

References

Indian Hindus
1764 births
Year of death missing
Annual fairs